Time Slave is a 1975 hybrid of historical fiction and science fiction by John Norman. In this book, Norman presents his personal theories of human evolution, exemplified by the case of a modern 20th century woman sent back in time 20,000 years or more; he mourns the loss of human evolutionary fitness and distortion of "natural" social relations which, in his view, occurred when farming spread and farmers squeezed hunter/gatherers to the ecological margins. Time Slave features Norman's social philosophy of male-dominance (as also in his Gor series), and expresses an unexplained connection between female sexual subordination and the speeding up of the development of space travel.

External links
 

1975 American novels
American science fiction novels
Novels set in prehistory
Prehistoric people in popular culture
Novels about time travel
DAW Books books
Gor